Mission Creek is a river in San Francisco.

Mission Creek may also refer to:

Populated places
Mission Creek, Minnesota
Mission Creek Township, Pine County, Minnesota

Streams

Canada
Mission Creek (British Columbia)

United States

California
Mission Creek (Laguna Creek), a tributary stream in Alameda County, California
Mission Creek (San Gabriel River), a tributary stream in Los Angeles County, California
Mission Creek (San Antonio River), a tributary stream in Monterey County, California 
Mission Creek (Whitewater River), a tributary stream in Riverside County, California.
 Mission Creek,  San Francisco 
Mission Creek (Santa Barbara), a stream in Santa Barbara County, California
Mission Creek (Hulbert Creek, Russian River), a tributary stream in Sonoma County, California

Other States
Mission Creek (Kansas)
Mission Creek (Saint Louis River), a stream in Minnesota
Mission Creek (Snake River), a stream in Minnesota
Mission Creek (Marion County, Oregon), a river in Oregon
Mission Creek (Stanley County, South Dakota), a stream in South Dakota
Mission Creek (Texas), a stream in Victoria County

See also
Mission Creek Music and Arts Festival